Megalomastomatidae is a family of tropical land snails  with an operculum, terrestrial gastropod mollusks in the superfamily Cyclophoroidea (according to the taxonomy of the Gastropoda by Bouchet & Rocroi, 2005).

Genera 
Genera within the family Megalomastomatidae include:
 Cyclopomops Bartsch & J. P. E. Morrison, 1942
 Farcimen Troschel, 1847
 Farcimoides Bartsch, 1942
 Hainesia L. Pfeffer, 1856: belongs to the subfamily Cyclophoridae incertae sedis 
 Megalomastoma Swainson, 1840 - the type genus of the family Megalomastomatidae
 Neopupina Kobelt, 1902
 Tomocyclus Crosse & P. Fischer, 1872
Synonyms
 Cyclopoma Troschel, 1847: synonym of Cyclopomops Bartsch & J. P. E. Morrison, 1942 (invalid: not Agassiz, 1833 [Pisces]; Cyclopomops is a replacement name)
 Cyrtotoma Mörch, 1852: synonym of Aperostoma Troschel, 1847 (invalid: objective junior synonym)
 Habropoma Crosse & P. Fischer, 1880: synonym of Aperostoma Troschel, 1847 (invalid: objective junior synonym)
 Lomastoma S. P. Woodward, 1856: synonym of Megalomastoma Swainson, 1840
 Megaloma S. P. Woodward, 1854: synonym of Megalomastoma Swainson, 1840
 Megalostoma [sic]: synonym of Megalomastoma Swainson, 1840 (misspelling of original genus name, Megalomastoma Swainson, 1840)
 Megalostomatinae [sic]: synonym of Megalomastomatinae W. T. Blanford, 1864 (misspelling)
 Subfamily Cochlostomatinae Kobelt, 1902: synonym of Cochlostomatidae Kobelt, 1902
 Subfamily Neopupininae Kobelt, 1902: synonym of Megalomastomatinae W. T. Blanford, 1864

References 

 Webster N., van Dooren T. & Schilthuizen M. (2012). Phylogenetic reconstruction and shell evolution of the Diplommatinidae (Gastropoda: Caenogastropoda: Diplommatinidae). Molecular Phylogenetics and Evolution. 63: 625-638.